The Holden HJ is a series of automobiles which were produced by Holden in Australia from 1974 to 1976. The HJ series was released on 4 October 1974 and was an improved and facelifted version of the superseded Holden HQ series which had been in production since 1971.

Model range 
All HJ models, aside from the One Tonner, were easily identified from the HQ by having a squared-off frontal treatment with wraparound indicator lights. The rear of the sedan models featured a new bumper and wraparound triangular taillights, while all other body styles kept the previous HQ's rear styling. Sedan and wagon also had revised rear quarter panels.

The mainstream passenger car range consisted of 4-door sedan and 5-door wagon models in three trim levels.
 Belmont sedan
 Belmont wagon
 Kingswood sedan
 Kingswood wagon
 Premier sedan
 Premier wagon

The Premier was distinguished from the cheaper models by a four headlight frontal treatment. Wagons rode on a wheelbase which was three inches (76.2  mm) longer than that of the sedans.

The performance-orientated Monaro range included two-door coupe and four-door sedan models:
 Monaro LS coupe
 Monaro GTS coupe
 Monaro GTS sedan

The base model Monaro Coupe was not carried forward from the HQ series, and the new range also saw the demise of the Monaro GTS350 Coupe and Sedan, meaning that the imported Chevrolet 350-cubic-inch (5.7-litre) V8 engine was no longer offered in any Holden model.

Commercial vehicle derivatives included coupe utility, panel van and cab chassis truck models:
 Utility
 Kingswood utility
 Panel van
 One Tonner (cab chassis)

There were two special vehicle packages available based upon various commercial vehicles:

 Sandman (option code XX7 (and XU3 added late 1975)) – available on Holden Utility (until early 1976) and Panel van and on Kingswood utility. XU3 became the original XX7 late 1975 and from then onwards XX7 vehicles used passenger vehicle tyres.
 Ambulance (option code BO6) – available on panel van and cab chassis.

The base utility and panel van models did not carry the Belmont name which had been applied to their HQ series equivalents, and they were marketed simply as the Holden utility and Holden panel van respectively, while The Sandman variants were equipped with various features from the Monaro GTS models.

The cab/chassis model was marketed as the Holden One Tonner, which in base form still used its own unique front treatment introduced with the previous HQ range, and would continue with the model until 1980. If a cab chassis or van was optioned as a BO6 (ambulance) it was fitted with the HJ Premier front and door trims.

Engines 
2.8-litre and 3.3-litre inline six-cylinder engines were available, as were 4.2-litre and 5.0-litre V8 units. The two Monaro GTS models were only offered with the eight-cylinder engines. 13B Wankel in the Mazda Roadpacer AP which is a rebadged HJ Premier.

Production 
The Holden HJ was replaced by the Holden HX series in July 1976, HJ production having totalled 176,202 vehicles.

Statesman HJ 

The Statesman HJ range of long-wheelbase luxury sedans developed from the Holden HJ series was also released in 1974. The two models in the range, the de Ville and the Caprice, were marketed as Statesmans rather than as Holdens.

References 

Cars of Australia
Holden vehicles by series
Cars introduced in 1974